Tyrone is a former town in Coshocton County, in the U.S. state of Ohio. The GNIS classifies it as a populated place.

History
A post office was established at Tyrone in 1850, and remained in operation until 1900.

References

Unincorporated communities in Coshocton County, Ohio
Unincorporated communities in Ohio